Korsør is a town on Zealand, Denmark. It is located in Slagelse Municipality. Until 2007 Korsør was the seat of Korsør Municipality.

Formerly the main ferry port from Zealand to Funen, the town of Korsør is divided into two halves by the Korsør Nor inlet, with the northern part named Halsskov. Most of the historical southern part of Korsør (Korsør proper) is low-lying and prone to flooding.

Culture
The Korsør Biograf Teater, which opened in August , is the world's oldest movie theater in continuous use that is still operating.

Sights
Korsør Mini Town (Danish: Korsør Miniby) is a miniature model of the town of Korsør as it looked in 1875. It is built in 1:10 scale and has existed since 2001.

Tårnborg is a manor located in Halsskov in Korsør. Tårnborg was originally a village, in which a castle was built in the 1100s. It was referred to as Korsør Castle and later came under the name of Dyrehovedgaard. It was renamed to Tårnborg in 1846. The manor owns 334 acres.

Korsør Fortification

Korsør Fortification (Danish: Korsør Fæstning) is a set of fortifications located centrally in Korsør. It was built in the 1100s. Today there are five buildings on the fortifications, though all are built at different times and only the tower originates from the castle that was located on the fortification. The tower is from the 1200s.

Korsør City and Strait Crossing Museum (Danish: Korsør By og Overfartsmuseum) is a museum located in Korsør. The museum was founded in 1983, and is focussed on the strait crossing from Korsør to Nyborg. The museum is located in a building on Korsør Fortification.

Notable residents

Public thought and politics
 Pia Adelsteen (born 1963), politician and member of parliament
 Hedevig Johanne Bagger (1740–1822), inn-keeper and postmaster
 Aage Friis (1870–1949), historian
 Hans A. Hansen (1877–1949), sailor for the United States Navy
 Hedda Lundh (1921–2012), resistance fighter during the German occupation of Denmark in World War II
 John Dyrby Paulsen (born 1963), politician and mayor of the municipality
 Morten Storm (born 1976), former PET agent
 Lis Tribler (born 1952), politician and former mayor

Art
 Jens Baggesen (1764–1826), poet.
 Urban Gad (1879–1947), film director
 Aage Giødesen (1863–1939), painter 
 Pia Juul (born 1962), poet and translator

Sport
 Casper Henningsen (born 1985), former football player
 Jim Larsen (born 1985), former football player
 Brian Nielsen (born 1965), former boxer

See also
 Death of Emilie Meng

External links

 Slagelse municipality website (In Danish)

References

Korsør
Cities and towns in Region Zealand
Slagelse Municipality